Star Wraith 2 (2000–2002) is the second game in the Starwraith 3D Games series. It expanded on Star Wraith in several ways including better graphics, a training course for beginners, and more combat modes.

Star Wraith 2 has been discontinued. It was released as freeware to the public as a publicity stunt for its successor, Star Wraith III. It is now almost impossible to find the game since the release of Star Wraith III, Star Wraith IV and RiftSpace as freeware has made Star Wraith 2 completely obsolete.

2001 video games
Star Wraith
Video games developed in the United States
Windows games
Windows-only games